Wei Lihuang (16 February 1897 – 17 January 1960) was a Chinese general who served the Nationalist government throughout the Chinese Civil War and Second Sino-Japanese War as one of China's most successful military commanders.

First joining the Kuomintang (KMT) during the early 1920s, Wei would rise to become general after the Northern Expedition, a two-year campaign to unify China. His later success under Chiang Kai-shek during the Bandit (Communist) Suppression Campaigns from 1930 to 1934 would earn him the nickname "Hundred Victories Wei".

War with Japan

A general during the Second Sino-Japanese War, Wei commanded the First War Area. With the entry of Great Britain and later the United States in the war against Japan, he was transferred to southern China as commander of the Nationalist Chinese XI Group Army.  He later replaced General Chen Cheng as commander of the Chinese Expeditionary Forces, known as Y Force. Y-Force consisted of over 100,000 Nationalist soldiers, and participated in major ground operations in support of American General Joseph W. Stilwell's offensive in northern Burma. Unlike many of his contemporaries, Wei was able to work effectively with American commanders.

Beginning his offensive into southern Yunnan on 11 May 1944, Wei's troops captured Tengchung on 15 September after two months of heavy fighting. Proceeding southward despite heavy resistance, his forces eventually linked up with Chinese divisions in Wanting, Burma on January 27, 1945. The success of this offensive allowed the Allies to reopen the former Burma Road supply network to China through Ledo, Burma, now named the Ledo Road. In concert with existing airlift operations over The Hump, the Ledo Road enabled overland transport of military supplies from Assam to Nationalist bases in China.

Postwar career

Recalled to northern China to again replace General Chen Cheng following the war, Wei was placed in command of KMT forces in northeast China in October 1947. After being cut off from land communication with the KMT with the communist capture of Chinchow (Jinzhou 锦州, Liaoning), he was supposedly planning for an offensive to recapture the Nationalist provincial capital before he was ordered to withdraw by Chiang Kai-shek. Shortly before the communist capture of Mukden (Shenyang), Wei would return to southern China following his replacement by his field commander Du Yuming in October 1948.

In spite of Wei's earlier success, his tenure in the northeast was remarkably unsuccessful. He defied orders for more than a year to withdraw, and lost 300,000 troops. Taylor (2009) writes that "Of those, 246,000 were captured, and many if not most were quickly incorporated into the PLA" (p. 389).

Chiang ordered Wei's house arrest. Wei made his way to Hong Kong in 1949, and moved to Beijing in 1955, where he would "participate in various organizations of the People's Republic" (Taylor, 2009, p. 389). He would live in the PRC until his death in 1960.

References
Dupuy, Trevor N. Harper Encyclopedia of Military Biography, New York, 1992
 http://www.generals.dk/general/Qiu_Qing-quan/_/China.html
Ministry of National Defense R.O.C 
US Naval War College 
 Taylor, Jay. The Generalissimo: Chiang Kai-Shek and the Struggle for Modern China, New York, 2009
 http://cgsc.leavenworth.army.mil/carl/download/csipubs/bjorge_huai.pdf 

1897 births
1960 deaths
Chinese military personnel of World War II
National Revolutionary Army generals from Anhui
People's Republic of China politicians from Anhui
Politicians from Hefei
Burials at Babaoshan Revolutionary Cemetery